Kim Hiorthøy (born March 17, 1973) is a Norwegian electronic musician, graphic designer, illustrator, filmmaker and writer.

Biography
Hiorthøy was born and raised in Trondheim, Norway, and studied at the Trondheim Academy of Fine Art (1991–96) as well as the Royal Danish Academy of Fine Arts in Copenhagen (1999–2000). During his tenure at the Trondheim Academy of Fine Art, Hiorthøy spent a year abroad in 1994 to attend the School of Visual Arts in New York.  There he worked extensively with Cinematographer Mott Hupfel.  Currently, he lives and works in Berlin, Germany. A fictionalized version of Hiorthøy is a character in Erlend Loe's novel L.

Career

Music
Hiorthøy began making music while attending the Trondheim Academy of Fine Art; he worked in the academy's sound studio until he left school and purchased his own equipment. After various "collaborations and accidents", his music was eventually introduced to Joakim Haugland of the Smalltown Supersound record label.  Haugland asked Hiorthøy to work with the label, and in 2001 Hiorthøy released his debut album, "Hei". He has subsequently released several albums, EPs, and 7-inch records with Smalltown Supersound.

Hiorthøy's musical style is difficult to classify; the Smalltown Supersound website offers the following description: "On his records Kim Hiorthøy combines weird beats, lo-fi/leftfield electronics, field recordings, electro-acoustic sounds and samples, resulting in a sound all his own."  His live sets, however, differ from his recordings, with louder, faster beats and a techno undertone.

Graphic design and film
While exploring music at the Trondheim Academy of Fine Art, Hiorthøy simultaneously began his work in graphic design.  He started to publish fanzines and design record sleeves for local bands, and as time passed he began to work more seriously in a variety of creative mediums.  To date, Hiorthøy has released several collections of photography, drawing and design, and has provided cover artworks for such record labels as Rune Grammofon, Smalltown Supersound, Smalltown Superjazzz and the rock group Motorpsycho.  He is currently represented by STANDARD, an Oslo-based gallery aimed at promoting contemporary Norwegian artists.  Some of his other creative achievements include film directing, film photography, and illustration for children's books.

In a 2004 interview with KultureFlash.com, Hiorthøy described the relationship between graphic design and music: "I regard them as very different things, even though the place in my head that decides if something works or not is the same for both".

Bibliography
"Tree Weekend", 2000, Die Gestalten Verlag
"Du kan ikke svikte din beste venn og bli god til å synge samtidig", 2002, Oktober
"Katalog", 2003, Smalltown Superbooks
"Tago Mago", 2007, Bergen Kunsthall on the occasion of the exhibition

Illustrations
Erlend Loe – "Fisken", 1994
Motorpsycho - "Timothy's Monster", 1994
Sissel Lie – "Pusegutten en en drittsekk!", 1995
Erlend Loe – "Kurt blir grusom", 1995
Sissel Lie – "Pusegutten og den lille gule", 1996
Erlend Loe – "Den store røde hunden", 1996
Motorpsycho - "Blissard", 1996
Sissel Lie – "Pusegutten er eldst og tykkest", 1997
Bjørn Sortland – "Den solbrente mammaen som blei bytta mot ti kamelar", 1997
Motorpsycho - "Angel And Daemons at Play", 1997
Erlend Loe – "Kurt for alle", 1998
Erlend Loe – "Kurt quo vadis?", 1998
Lunde, Stein Erik – "Eggg", 1998
Motorpsycho - "Trust Us", 1998
Sissel Lie – "Pusegutter tåler nesten alt", 1999
Tore Renberg – "Hando Kjendo : søndag", 1999
Bjørn Sortland – "Den solbrente mammaen som kledde seg naken for å bli kunst", 1999
Kim Fupz Aakeson – "Da gud fikk en hobby", 1999
Tore Renberg – "Hando Kjendo : torsdag", 2000
Motorpsycho - "Let Them Eat Cake", 2000
Erlend Loe – "Kurt 3", 2001
Motorpsycho - "Phanerothyme", 2001
Motorpsycho - "It's a Love Cult", 2002
Erlend Loe – "Kurt koker hodet", 2003
Jaga Jazzist – "What We Must", 2005
Motorpsycho - "Black Hole/Blank Canvas", 2006
Motorpsycho - "Little Lucid Moments", 2008
Motorpsycho - "Child of the Future", 2009
Motorpsycho - "Heavy Metal Fruit", 2010
Motorpsycho - "The Death Defying Unicorn", 2012
Motorpsycho - "Still Life With Eggplant", 2013
Motorpsycho - "Behind The Sun", 2014
Motorpsycho - "Here Be Monsters", 2016

Photography
Lindstrøm – Where You Go I Go Too, 2008

Discography
"Hei", 2000 (CD), Smalltown Supersound
"Melke", 2001 (CD), Smalltown Supersound
"Hopeness EP", 2004 (CD), Smalltown Supersound
"For the Ladies", 2004 (CD), Smalltown Supersound
"Live Shet", 2004 (CD), Smalltown Supersound
"This Record Can Not Set Me on Fire", 2006 (12"), Smalltown Supersound
"I'm This, I'm That", 2006 (7"), Smalltown Supersound
"My Last Day", 2007 (CD), Smalltown Supersound
"Dogs", 2014 (CD, 12"), Smalltown Supersound

References

External links 
 Gallery of most of his work for Rune Grammofon

1973 births
Living people
Norwegian writers
Norwegian illustrators
Norwegian electronic musicians
Intelligent dance musicians
Norwegian graphic designers
Royal Danish Academy of Fine Arts alumni
Smalltown Supersound artists